Alexander William George Duff, 1st Duke of Fife,  (10 November 1849 – 29 January 1912) styled Viscount Macduff between 1857 and 1879 and known as the Earl Fife between 1879 and 1889, was a British peer who married Princess Louise, the third child and eldest daughter of King Edward VII and Queen Alexandra.

Early life 
Fife was born Alexander Duff in Edinburgh, the son of James Duff and his wife, Lady Agnes Hay. His father was a grandson of the 3rd Earl Fife and heir presumptive to the 4th Earl Fife. His mother was the second daughter of the 18th Earl of Erroll and his wife, Elizabeth FitzClarence, an illegitimate daughter of King William IV. When his father succeeded as 5th Earl Fife in 1857, Duff acquired the courtesy title of "Viscount Macduff". He attended Eton from 1863 to 1866.

Political and diplomatic career
In 1872, while known as Viscount Macduff, Fife became Lord-Lieutenant of Elginshire in Scotland and continued in the position for thirty years. From 1874 to 1879, he also served as Member of Parliament for Elginshire and Nairnshire, standing as a Liberal. On 7 August 1879, he succeeded his father as 6th Earl Fife in the Peerage of Ireland (and as 2nd Baron Skene in the Peerage of the United Kingdom, thus gaining a seat in the House of Lords. At this time, he also succeeded in a number of Scottish feudal baronies, including MacDuff, which was named for James Duff, 2nd Earl Fife.  He served in the Liberal government of William Ewart Gladstone as Captain of the Honourable Corps of Gentlemen-at-Arms from May 1880 to January  1881, and served on a special diplomatic mission to invest the King of Saxony with the Order of the Garter in February 1882. He was appointed Honorary Colonel of the 1st Banffshire Artillery Volunteers on 15 March 1884. In 1885, Queen Victoria created him "Earl of Fife" in the Peerage of the United Kingdom. He took part in the founding of the Chartered Company of South Africa and served as one of its vice presidents until the Jameson Raid of 1896. He was Lord Lieutenant of the County of London from February 1900 until his death in 1912.

Marriage
On Saturday 27 July 1889, Lord Fife married Princess Louise, the eldest daughter of the then-Prince and Princess of Wales, at the Private Chapel at Buckingham Palace. The couple were third cousins in descent from George III. The wedding marked the second time a descendant of Queen Victoria married a British subject (the first being the marriage of Princess Louise, the Queen's fourth daughter, to the Duke of Argyll). On the day of the wedding, the Queen elevated Lord Fife to the further dignity of Duke of Fife and Marquess of Macduff, in the County of Banff, in the peerage of the United Kingdom.

The marriage of the Duke of Fife and Princess Louise produced three children:
 Alastair Duff (who would have been styled Marquess of Macduff, stillborn 16 June 1890);
 Lady Alexandra Duff (later styled H.H. Princess Alexandra, 17 May 1891 – 26 February 1959) married her first cousin once removed Prince Arthur of Connaught (13 January 1883 – 12 September 1938), and had one son, Alastair Windsor, 2nd Duke of Connaught and Strathearn; and
 Lady Maud Duff (later styled H.H Princess Maud, 3 April 1893 – 14 December 1945) married the 11th Earl of Southesk, and had one son, James Carnegie, 3rd Duke of Fife.

Death and funeral

In December 1911, while sailing to Egypt on the SS Delhi, the Duke and his family were shipwrecked off the coast of Morocco. They spent some time in the water before being rescued and then had to walk four miles to find accommodation. Although they all survived, the Duke fell ill with pleurisy, probably contracted as a result of the shipwreck.

He died at Aswan in Egypt on 29 January 1912, and his elder daughter, Princess Alexandra, succeeded to the dukedom of 1900, becoming Duchess of Fife and Countess of Macduff. His other titles, including the dukedom created in 1889, all became extinct. 

On his death his estate was valued for probate purposes at £1 million, an amount equivalent to £79.7 million in 2022.

The Duke's body was brought home to Great Britain by sea, in a lead
coffin. It rested in the Royal Vault below St George's Chapel, Windsor Castle, from 28 February 1912 until 6 August 1912, when it was transferred to Scotland for burial in St Ninian's Chapel at Mar Lodge, Braemar, Aberdeenshire. The Glasgow Herald reported:

Honours

The Duke of Fife received a new patent as Duke of Fife and Earl of Macduff in the Peerage of the United Kingdom in April 1900, with special remainder to his daughters by Princess Louise and their heirs male. The result was that he held two dukedoms of Fife; the 1889 creation (with the subsidiary Marquessate of Macduff) would become extinct in the absence of a son and the 1900 creation (with the subsidiary Earldom of Macduff) would devolve upon his elder daughter in the absence of a son. In November 1905, his father-in-law, now King Edward VII, bestowed the title Princess Royal on the Duchess of Fife and declared that Lady Alexandra Duff and Lady Maud Duff should henceforth hold the title of Princess of Great Britain and Ireland with the style Highness.

Queen Victoria created the future Duke of Fife a Knight of the Thistle; George V created him an Extra Knight of the Garter. He was also sworn a Privy Counsellor in 1880. At the coronation of his father-in-law, King Edward VII, in August 1902, and again at his brother-in-law King George V's coronation in June 1911, the Duke of Fife acted as Lord High Constable. In addition to his London residence, 15 Portman Square, the Duke owned two estates in Scotland: Mar Lodge, Aberdeenshire, and Mountcoffer House, Banff.

Orders and decorations
 :
 Knight of the Most Ancient and Most Noble Order of the Thistle (KT), 24 March 1881
 Knight Grand Cross of the Royal Victorian Order (GCVO), 2 February 1901
 Royal Victorian Chain, 11 August 1902
 Decoration for Officers of the Royal Naval Volunteer Reserve (VD), 1904
 Knight of the Most Noble Order of the Garter (KG), 19 June 1911
 : Knight Grand Cross of the Royal Norwegian Order of Saint Olav, with Collar, 13 November 1906
 : Knight of the House Order of the Rue Crown, 1882

Ancestry

References

External links 

 
 Glasgow Herald, 9 August 1912, p. 8 (online)

1912 deaths
Anglo-Scots
Dukes of Fife
Peers of the United Kingdom created by Queen Victoria
Knights Grand Cross of the Royal Victorian Order
Knights of Justice of the Order of St John
Knights of the Garter
Knights of the Thistle
Lord High Constables of England
Lord-Lieutenants of the County of London
Lord-Lieutenants of Elginshire
Duff, Alexander
People educated at Eton College
Politicians from Edinburgh
Duff, Alexander
UK MPs who inherited peerages
UK MPs who were granted peerages
1849 births
Honourable Corps of Gentlemen at Arms
Members of the Privy Council of the United Kingdom
Earls Fife
Royal reburials